is a dam in Chikuhoku, Nagano Prefecture, Japan.

References

Dams in Nagano Prefecture
Gravity dams